Class T211 was a series of diesel locomotive, used Hekurudha Shqiptare, the railway company of Albania. Some sources said 4 locomotives were delivered. However, only two locomotives were ever seen in Albania. The locomotives are almost identical to the T-211's delivered to ČSD.

References

Diesel locomotives of Albania
Standard gauge locomotives of Albania